GB Rail may refer to:

GB Railfreight, railway freight operator in the United Kingdom
GB Railways, former owner of train companies in the United Kingdom
Great British Railways, future government body in the United Kingdom company